Kasundra Primylean "Kassy" Betinol (born June 14, 2001), also known by the Chinese name Kang Mulan, is a Canadian ice hockey player and member of the Chinese national ice hockey team, currently playing in the ECAC Hockey conference of the NCAA Division I with the Colgate Raiders women's ice hockey program. She first played college ice hockey with the Minnesota Duluth Bulldogs women's ice hockey program during the 2019–20 and 2020–21 seasons, before transferring to Colgate University after playing the 2021–22 season in the Zhenskaya Hockey League (ZhHL) with the KRS Vanke Rays.

Betinol represented China in the women's ice hockey tournament at the 2022 Winter Olympics in Beijing.

Career statistics

Regular season and playoffs

International

References

External links
 
 

Living people
2001 births
Canadian expatriate ice hockey players in China
Canadian expatriate ice hockey players in Russia
Canadian expatriate ice hockey players in the United States
Canadian emigrants to China
Naturalized citizens of the People's Republic of China
Canadian women's ice hockey forwards
Chinese women's ice hockey forwards
Colgate Raiders women's ice hockey players
Ice hockey people from Alberta
Ice hockey players at the 2022 Winter Olympics
Minnesota Duluth Bulldogs women's ice hockey players
Olympic ice hockey players of China
People from Okotoks
Shenzhen KRS Vanke Rays players